Barbara Roy was born in Kinston, North Carolina and is a dance music singer famed for her beautiful and powerful voice as well as her exquisite enunciation. She scored several big hits on the Billboard Hot Dance Music/Club Play chart during the 1970s as the lead vocalist for Ecstasy, Passion & Pain, then went on to have more success as a solo artist.

In 1986, Roy hit number one on the dance chart with "Gotta See You Tonight". It had a two-week run at the top of the chart, while also charting on the Hot Black Singles chart, peaking at number eighty-three.

Barbara Roy is a devout Christian and has extended her professional name to Barbara Roy Gaskins.  Based in Washington DC, Barbara now performs contemporary gospel music and released a new album, "Climbing", in 2002.

References

See also
List of number-one dance hits (United States)
List of artists who reached number one on the US Dance chart

American women singers
American disco musicians
American dance musicians
Living people
People from Kinston, North Carolina
Year of birth missing (living people)
21st-century American women